Kandahari may refer to:
something or someone of, from, or related to Kandahar, a city in Afghanistan
 Southern Pashto, or Kandahari, a language of Afghanistan
 Kandahari rupee, former currency of Afghanistan
 Kandahari Begum (1593–?), Indian queen consort
 Kako Kandahari, Aghan detainee at Guantanamo

See also 
 Kandari (disambiguation)
 Kandhari, a surname
 Qandahari, village in Baghlan, Afghanistan
 Boz Qandahari, village in Kunduz, Afghanistan, site of the Battle of Boz Qandahari
 Haji Dost Muhammad Qandhari (1801–1868), 19th-century Afghan Sufi saint